James Mangan may refer to:

 James Clarence Mangan (1803–1849), Irish poet
 James T. Mangan (1896–1970), famous eccentric, public relations man and author
 Jim Mangan (1929–2007), American baseball player